Old Fitzgerald is a brand of wheated bourbon distilled in Louisville, Kentucky by Heaven Hill Distilleries, Inc.

History
Old Fitzgerald was first produced in 1870 for rail and steamship lines and private clubs located primarily in the south by John E. Fitzgerald in Frankfort, Kentucky. Around 1900, "Old Fitz" was released to the public in America and Europe. It was one of the few distilled using the pot still method, and continued to do so until around 1913.  During Prohibition, Old Fitzgerald was one of a select few to distill under government supervision for the national medicinal trade, it was soon after acquired by Pappy Van Winkle for $10,000 who then introduced the "Whisper of Wheat" to the original recipe.  By substituting some wheat for the more traditional rye in the grain recipe, Old Fitzgerald presented a rounder, softer profile than other bourbons.

Old Fitzgerald was produced at the Stitzel-Weller Distillery until the distillery was shut down in 1992 and production transferred to Diageo's newly constructed Bernheim Distillery in Louisville. In 1999, Diageo sold the brand, along with the Bernheim Distillery, to Heaven Hill, which currently produces and markets Old Fitzgerald.

Old Fitzgerald products

Current
Larceny Small Batch
Larceny Barrel Proof
Old Fitzgerald Bottled-in-Bond

Previous
Old Fitzgerald Prime
Old Fitzgerald's 1849
Very Special Old Fitzgerald 12 Years Old
Very Old Fitzgerald (8 year)
Very Xtra Old Fitzgerald (10 year)
Very Very Old Fitzgerald (12 year)
Very Very Old Fitzgerald (15 year)
Very Very Old Fitzgerald (18 year)

References

Further reading
  

Bourbon whiskey
Economy of Louisville, Kentucky
American brands
Alcoholic drink brands
1870 introductions
1870 establishments in Kentucky